Ayala station (also known as Ayala Center station) is an underground Manila Metro Rail Transit (MRT) station situated on Line 3. It is one of two underground stations that can be found on the line, the other being Buendia. The station is located in Makati and is named so due to its proximity to two places bearing the Ayala name: Ayala Center and Ayala Avenue.

The station is the eleventh station for trains headed to Taft Avenue and the third station for trains headed to North Avenue. The most recognizable landmark near the station is Ayala Center, one of the most popular shopping centers in the Philippines. It is one of two stations that are considered within the Makati Central Business District (the other being Buendia). 

It is one of five stations on the line where passengers can catch a train going in the opposite direction without paying a new fare due to the station's layout. The other four stations are Araneta Center-Cubao, Shaw Boulevard, Boni, Buendia, and Taft Avenue. Excluding Araneta Center-Cubao station, it is also one of four stations on the line with its concourse level located above the platform.

The station also has a shopping center within the station (similar to Shaw Boulevard station), with restaurants, shops, and facilities surrounding the concourse level of the station above the main platform.

Nearby landmarks
The station is at the heart of the Makati Central Business District. It has an elevated walkway that connects it to SM Makati, which in turn is connected to Glorietta, Rustan's, The Landmark, Greenbelt and the rest of the Ayala Center, and to One Ayala. It provides direct access to Ayala Center through the station's main entrance located between SM Makati and One Ayala. The station is also the closest to adjacent Forbes Park, Dasmariñas, and Urdaneta villages, Apartment Ridge row, as well as Bonifacio Global City via McKinley Road, which were also developed by the Ayalas. 

The Philippine Stock Exchange (formerly in Ayala Avenue but currently in Bonifacio Global City) along with the major financial headquarters of Bank of the Philippine Islands, China Bank, HSBC Philippines, Citibank Philippines, and Standard Chartered Bank Philippines are all within the station's vicinity.

Nearby hotels include Ascott Makati, Holiday Inn & Suites Makati, Fairmont Manila/Raffles Manila, Makati Shangri-La Hotel, Peninsula Manila, Dusit Thani Manila, Crown Regency Hotel, Hotel Celeste, Jinjiang Inn Makati, Astoria Greenbelt, Makati Diamond Hotel, and New World Makati Hotel. The Ayala Triangle Gardens, Ayala Museum, Filipinas Heritage Library, and the Asian Institute of Management are also nearby.

Transportation links

The station is considered a major transportation hub, with multiple bus stops lying under the station. Passengers can board buses to and from destinations within Metro Manila, including through the EDSA Carousel, and to the provinces at One Ayala and beside McKinley Exchange Corporate Center. Point-to-point buses may also be boarded within various stops within the One Ayala and Greenbelt complexes, as well as in Legazpi Village, located further away. A few meters from the station's Northbound exit lies the BGC Bus EDSA Ayala terminal at the McKinley Exchange Corporate Center, where buses to different destinations within Bonifacio Global City are available.

Passengers can also board a jeepney bound for the Central Business District and the nearby Bonifacio Global City in Taguig, Makati, Pateros, and Pasay at McKinley Road, at The Landmark along Makati Avenue, and at Park Square, which is connected by a bridge from SM Makati, respectively. UV Express vans bound for Metro Manila and nearby provinces can also be boarded at Park Square. Taxis also stop near the station and passengers can board them at nearby SM Makati, Glorietta 4, or Landmark. 

A bicycle-sharing system is provided by Moovr within the Makati and BGC vicinity, with a rental hub located at the southbound entrance of Ayala station.

Gallery

References

See also
List of rail transit stations in Metro Manila
Manila Metro Rail Transit System Line 3

Manila Metro Rail Transit System stations
Railway stations opened in 2000
Buildings and structures in Makati
Makati Central Business District